Cannabis in Maryland is legal for medical use and illegal for recreational use, but as of January 1, 2023 thru June 30, 2023, decriminalization is temporarily expanded from possession of less than 1 oz (28 grams) to less than 1.5 oz (42 grams), prior to full legalized recreational use of 1.5 oz or less on July 1st, 2023 due to the passage of the 2022 Maryland Question 4 referendum. In 2013, a state law was enacted to establish a state-regulated medical cannabis program.  The program, known as the Natalie M. LaPrade Maryland Medical Cannabis Commission (MMCC) became operational on December 1, 2017. 

A majority of voters approved the 2022 Maryland Question 4 referendum to legalize recreational use of cannabis on November 8, 2022 with 65.5% of voters in favor and 34.5% against. It will fully take effect on July 1, 2023. Under the new law, adults 21 and over will be permitted to grow up to two cannabis plants out of public view, and possess no more than 1.5oz of recreational cannabis on their person. Possession of between 1.5-2.5 oz will still be punishable by a civil fine of up to $250, and over 2.5 oz will be punishable by up to a $1000 fine and up to 6 months in jail. Additionally, a companion bill that was designed to be triggered upon passage of the referendum included a provision to automatically expunge all cases in which possession of cannabis was the only charge, as well as allow for individuals incarcerated for cannabis possession to petition for resentencing.

Prohibition and decriminalization
In 2010, Maryland had the fifth-highest overall arrest rate for marijuana possession in the United States, with 409 arrests per 100,000 residents. (The national rate was 256 per 100,000 people). In that year, marijuana arrests made up 49.9% of all drug possession arrests in the state. In Maryland, Black people were 2.9 times more likely than whites to be arrested for marijuana possession.

In April 2014, Governor Martin O'Malley signed a law that decriminalized the possession of 10 grams or less of marijuana. The measure made such possession a civil infraction, similar to a traffic ticket. The measure took effect on October 1, 2014. Under the law, people over age 21 "who are accused of having less than 10 grams will have to pay a fine and attend a drug education program". The fine not exceeding $100 for first-time offenders, $250 for second-time offenders, and $500 for third or subsequent offenders.

In 2016, the Maryland General Assembly, controlled by Democrats, passed SB 517, which decriminalized the possession of marijuana paraphernalia (such as rolling papers, pipes and bongs) and decriminalized the smoking of marijuana in public. The measure makes both civil offenses punishable by a fine of up to $500. Republican Governor Larry Hogan vetoed the bill, but the Assembly overrode the veto.

From January 1, 2023 until June 30, 2023, decriminalization is temporarily expanded from possession of less than 1 oz (28 grams) to less than 1.5 oz (42 grams) to a civil infraction subject to $100 fine as provided by House Bill 837, prior to full legalized recreational use of 1.5 oz or less on July 1st, 2023 due to the passage of the 2022 Maryland Question 4 referendum.

Recreational legalization
In the 2010s, there were several efforts to legalize the recreational use of marijuana, but none were successful. However, support for legalization did increase in the state; Washington Post-University of Maryland polls found that 54% of Marylanders supported legalization in 2014, and 61% supported legalization in 2016.

In 2017, legalization was introduced in the state legislature (sponsored by Democratic Delegate Curt Anderson, Democratic Senator Richard Madaleno, and others) to legalize, tax, and regulate recreational marijuana in the state. The legislation also contained a provision that would expunge prior convictions for possession of marijuana in those amounts or less. The legislation did not pass.

In 2019, a task force of the General Assembly, the Marijuana Legalization Workgroup, began to consider ways to possibly legalize the adult use of recreational marijuana in Maryland.

In 2021, Delegate Jazz Lewis, a Democrat from Prince George's County, introduced H.B. 32, which would legalize the adult use of recreational marijuana and expunge prior cannabis related convictions. Another marijuana legalization bill that has been brought up in 2021, is SB 708, which has been introduced by State Senator Brian Feldman, a Democrat from Montgomery County. Feldman and Lewis are working to "harmonize" the two bills.

On July 16, 2021, Maryland House of Delegates Speaker Adrienne A. Jones announced that a referendum should decide whether to legalize recreational use of cannabis and that The House will pass legislation early next year to put this question before the voters. She also formed a bipartisan work group to work out the myriad details that such legalization would entail, from changes to criminal laws to the taxing structure.

2022 referendum
This bill would also establish a Cannabis Business Assistance Fund to support equity initiatives for minority- and women-owned businesses. That fund would go toward incubator and educational programs to promote participation in the industry by people most impacted by criminalization. The bill would also automatically expunge prior criminal convictions for conduct made legal under the proposed law.

In April 2022, the Governor of Maryland allowed a bill to become law - with no action of a signature or veto to legalize cannabis recreationally within Maryland. Medicinal cannabis was already legal in Maryland. However, another bill that passed the Maryland General Assembly in April 2022, puts the very same cannabis policy straight onto the ballot box for Maryland voters to implement in the November 2022 election as an initiative (2022 Maryland Question 4) without a Governor's signature (a bypass mechanism).

Voters approved the 2022 Maryland Question 4 referendum on November 8, 2022 with around 65.6% of voters in favor. It will fully take effect on July 1, 2023. Under the new law, it will be legal to possess up to 1.5 oz of cannabis for recreational use, as well as to grow and maintain no more than two cannabis plants out of public view; however, possession of between 1.5-2.5 oz will still be punishable by a civil fine of up to $250, and more than 2.5 oz will be punishable by up to 6 months in jail, and a criminal fine not to exceed $1,000. Additionally, upon passage of the November 2022 Question 4 referendum, a companion bill was triggered which will automatically expunge all convictions in which cannabis possession was the only charge, and allow those currently incarcerated for cannabis possession to petition for resentencing. The law does not setup a framework for retail sales.

2023 Recreational cannabis retail sales process
On 3 February 2023, The Maryland General Assembly filed a bill in anticipation of the state’s recreational cannabis bill, where if it passed, there aims be recreational cannabis dispensaries open for business on July 1, 2023. This also entails some existing licensed medical cannabis companies would be able to pay a “hefty fee” to convert to a license that would allow them to sell cannabis to recreational customers. But it’s not yet known how much or how soon companies would be able to convert.There also will be dozens of new licenses created.

Medical cannabis
On May 22, 2003, Governor Bob Ehrlich signed a bill into a law that took effect on October 1, 2003, that instituted a maximum fine of $100 for people using marijuana for pain relief. However the legislation did not protect users of medical marijuana from arrest and it did not establish a registry program.

In May 2013, Governor O'Malley signed legislation that established a medical marijuana program in Maryland. The legislation restricts cannabis distribution to academic medical centers, which will monitor patients. In April 2014, Governor O'Malley signed another legislation called House Bill 881, which took effect on June 1, 2014, and allowed for the creation of a medical marijuana infrastructure.  By September 2016, Maryland state officials were considering more than 800 applications for prospective dispensaries; under the law, there is a cap of 94 dispensary licenses, two per state Senate district.

In 2016, the Maryland Medical Cannabis Commission awarded 15 preliminary licenses to grow medical marijuana (out of a pool of almost 150 applicants) and a further 15 licenses to process medical marijuana "into pills, oils and other medical products." The Commission received almost 150 grower applications and 124 processor applications. Seven companies received licenses to both grow and process. The selection process was controversial because—although the selection process was blinded and applications were ranked by outside evaluators—many successful applicants had political connections. One unsuccessful grower applicant who ranked higher than some successful applicants sued the state, alleging that the Commission's reshuffling was arbitrary.

Under Maryland's approach, physicians, nurse practitioners, dentists, podiatrists and nurse midwives may certify patients as eligible for medical marijuana. As of November 2016, just 172 of the state's practicing physicians (about 1% of the state's total number) registered to participate in Maryland's medical marijuana program. In addition, several large health systems in the state, citing the federal law against marijuana, said they would bar their doctors from recommending medical marijuana, including LifeBridge Health and MedStar Health.

On December 1, 2017, after five years of delay, Maryland's medical marijuana program became operational and sales began. At that time, the Maryland Medical Cannabis Commission had authorized 14 growers, 12 processors and nine dispensaries in the state; 550 health-care providers were registered to certify patients as eligible; and 8,500 patients were certified by the Commission to buy medical marijuana. Over the next two years, Maryland's medical marijuana sector expanded significantly; by September 2019, Maryland had 18 licensed growers, 82 licensed dispensaries, and 70,000 registered patients (slightly more than 1% of the state's total population).

Legality
By state statute, defendants who can prove medical necessity at trial face a maximum penalty of $100.

In Pacheco v. State (2019), the Maryland Court of Appeals determined that "the mere odor of marijuana coupled with possession of what is clearly less than ten grams of marijuana, absent other circumstances," is not sufficient probable cause for police to arrest and search a person within the state.

See also
Cannabis in Washington, D.C.
Cannabis in Virginia

References

External links
Official website of the Natalie M. LaPrade Maryland Medical Cannabis Commission

 
Maryland law
Healthcare in Maryland